The Article 12 of the Constitution of Costa Rica abolishes Costa Rica's army as a permanent institution, making Costa Rica one of the first countries in the world to do so as the current Constitution was enacted in 1949. Costa Rica is one of the few countries without armed forces and, alongside Panama, one of the few that is not a microstate. However, like Panama, Costa Rica does have limited military capacities with its Public Forces which have both police and defense functions and had taken part in military operations since 1949. 

Contrary to popular belief, the article does not really completely abolish the army, it only establishes that the army cannot be a permanent standing organization The article does establish that Costa Rica may create an army for national defense or for international cooperation, but also clarifies that it will always be submitted to civilian authority. 

The date of the abolition of the army is celebrated in Costa Rica as a national holiday.

Text of the article

English translation according to the site CostaRicanLaw.com:

Historical background

Costa Rica's army was abolished soon after the end of the 1948 civil war by decision of the Constituent Assembly and the enactment of the Constitution on 31 October 1949. Costa Rica's Army headquarters, the Cuartel Bellavista in the capital San José, is transferred to the University of Costa Rica and is where currently Museo Nacional de Costa Rica is located.

Although several figures have claim authorship of the idea, generally the victorious caudillo of the war José Figueres Ferrer is credited for its abolishing. Whilst some critics point his motivations more as an effort to avoid an impending coup (and indeed Costa Rica hasn't had a coup since 1949, something unusual for the region) others reasons have been signaled including the fact that the army at the time was made mostly of foreign mercenary of the Caribbean Legion or that it was obsolete and an unnecessary expend of resources that were redirected on education and healthcare. 

Despite this, Costa Ricans in general show pride for this event and the country has a very rooted pacifist and anti-militarist culture.

Criticism

Criticism about the issue are split generally under two camps. On one side critics mostly on the left of the spectrum who question the effectiveness of the measure and consider that Costa Rica's abolishing of the army was in name only, and that for all effects Costa Rica still has a pseudo-military on the Public Forces, which are not only used for internal repression like any other army, but also get involved in both domestic and international US-lead military operations. 

The opposite criticism come mostly from far-right circles who question the decision of not having an army and advocate for its re-installment.

References

Military history of Costa Rica
Constitutions of Costa Rica
Pacifism